WGGN-TV (channel 52) is a religious independent television station licensed to Sandusky, Ohio, United States, serving the Cleveland and Toledo television markets. It is owned by Christian Broadcasting Ministries alongside two religious radio stations: Castalia-licensed WGGN (97.7 FM) and Willard-based WLRD (96.9 FM). The three stations share studios in Castalia; WGGN-TV's transmitter is located in New London.

Operating on a commercial license, the station presently broadcasts religious programming from local churches and national ministries. It also airs infomercials in overnights and on Saturday mornings.

History

The station was founded in 1980 and first signed on the air on December 5, 1982 as an affiliate of the Trinity Broadcasting Network.

Technical information

Subchannels
The station's digital signal is multiplexed:

Analog-to-digital conversion
WGGN-TV shut down its analog signal, over UHF channel 52, on June 12, 2009, the official date in which full-power television stations in the United States transitioned from analog to digital broadcasts under federal mandate. The station's digital signal remained on its pre-transition UHF channel 42. Through the use of PSIP, digital television receivers display the station's virtual channel as its former UHF analog channel 52, which was among the high band UHF channels (52-69) that were removed from broadcasting use as a result of the transition.

References

External links
Official website

Television channels and stations established in 1982
1982 establishments in Ohio
GGN-TV
Sandusky, Ohio
Religious television stations in the United States